Army Men Advance is a top-down shooter video game developed by DC Studios and published by the 3DO Company exclusively for Game Boy Advance. Much like Army Men: Sarge's Heroes, the story has General Plastro and his army of tan figurines have decided to take over the world and it is up to Sarge and reporter Vikki Grimm to thwart the conquest. Throughout the game, the player is required to rescue team members, infiltrate tan bases, escape from a jail, investigate an extra terrestrial presence, and retrieve communications equipment. The player can choose to play as either Sarge or Vikki, but the quests for each are identical and once a character has been chosen it is impossible to switch to the other unless the player wants to start again from the first mission.

Reception

Army Men Advance received "mixed" reviews according to the review aggregation website Metacritic. NextGen called it "A decent, if not amazing[,] game, at least until Capcom gives us that GBA version of Commando we've been dreaming about" (which is ironic, since the Game Boy Advance version of that game does not exist).

References

External links

2001 video games
Army Men
Game Boy Advance games
Game Boy Advance-only games
Multiplayer and single-player video games
Video games developed in the United Kingdom
DC Studios games
The 3DO Company games